The NWA Canadian Junior Heavyweight Championship was the National Wrestling Alliance Board-controlled version of the Canadian Junior Heavyweight title. Previous non-NWA versions of the title also existed in Alberta, Ontario and Manitoba. The title has existed since 1998.

The NWA Canadian Light Heavyweight Championship was a title that existed before the NWA Canadian Junior Heavyweight Championship.  The NWA Canadian Light Heavyweight Championship was vacated upon the inception of the NWA Canadian Junior Heavyweight Championship.

Being a professional wrestling championship, it is not won via direct competition; it is instead won via a predetermined ending to a match or awarded to a wrestler because of a wrestling angle.  There have been 37 reigns by 24 wrestlers with five vacancies.  One of the vacancies came when Tony Kozina vacated the title upon winning the NWA World Junior Heavyweight Championship.  The title is currently inactive after being deactivated by Elite Canadian Championship Wrestling, an NWA member, in December 2011.

Title history

Combined reigns

See also
List of National Wrestling Alliance championships

References

External links
NWA Canadian Junior Heavyweight Championship

Junior heavyweight wrestling championships
Canadian professional wrestling championships
National Wrestling Alliance championships